Barcita is a genus of moths of the family Erebidae. The genus was erected by Moschler in 1886.

Species
Barcita duomita (Schaus, 1901)
Barcita ilia (Druce, 1889)
Barcita subviridescens (Walker, 1858)

References

Calpinae